Ferruzzano is a comune (municipality) in the Province of Reggio Calabria in the Italian region of Calabria, located about  southwest of Catanzaro and about  east of Reggio Calabria.

Ferruzzano borders the following municipalities: Bianco, Bruzzano Zeffirio, Caraffa del Bianco, Sant'Agata del Bianco.  It is the home town of Giuseppe Zangara, the man who tried to assassinate Franklin Delano Roosevelt.

On October 23, 1907, a magnitude 5.9 earthquake struck Calabria, at a depth of 33.0 km. The epicentral area included Ferruzzano, where many houses collapsed almost completely, and 158 persons, or 8% of its population, were killed. Ferruzano had been hit as well in the 1905 Calabria earthquake. Several aftershocks followed: on November 17, 1907, Ferruzzano was hit by an earthquake again, as well as on January 23, 1908. New houses built after the earthquakes of 1905 and 1907 resisted the shocks of the 1908 Messina earthquake.

Demographic evolution

References

Cities and towns in Calabria